SSBR can refer to:
 Society for the Study of Black Religion, an American academic society 
 Solution styrene-butadiene rubber, a form of synthetic rubber
 Super Smash Bros. Brawl, a video game for the Nintendo Wii